The Prix du Polar Européen (English: European Crime Fiction Prize) is a French literary prize awarded each year for the best crime or thriller novel by a European author in French or a French translation.  The award was launched by the weekly magazine Le Point in 2003.

The jury is composed of police officers, publishing professionals and journalists.  The prize was originally delivered to the winning author at the opening of the Nice Book Festival but, since 2007, it has been awarded at the Quais du Polar in Lyon.

Juries 
The President of the first jury was Charles Diaz, the former Inspector-General of the IGPN ("Inspection Générale de la Police Nationale" or General Inspectorate of the National Police).  The President of the tenth jury, in 2012, was the French politician Jean-Louis Debré.

Winners 

2003 establishments in France
Awards established in 2003
French literary awards
Mystery and detective fiction awards